Formicoxenus is a genus of ants in the subfamily Myrmicinae.

Species
 Formicoxenus chamberlini (Wheeler, 1904)
 Formicoxenus diversipilosus (Smith, 1939)
 Formicoxenus hirticornis (Emery, 1895)
 Formicoxenus nitidulus (Nylander, 1846)
 Formicoxenus provancheri (Emery, 1895)
 Formicoxenus quebecensis Francoeur, Loiselle & Buschinger, 1985
 Formicoxenus sibiricus (Forel, 1899)

References

External links

Myrmicinae
Ant genera
Taxa named by Gustav Mayr
Taxonomy articles created by Polbot